William or Billy Hartung may refer to:

 William D. Hartung (born 1955), American military expert
 Billy Hartung (actor) (born 1971), American actor and dancer
 Billy Hartung (footballer) (born 1995), Australian rules footballer

See also
Willi Hartung (1915–1987), Swiss painter
Wilfried Hartung (born 1953), German swimmer